The Trip to Greece is a 2020 British comedy film directed by Michael Winterbottom. It is the fourth installment of Winterbottom's film adaptations of the TV series The Trip, following The Trip (2011), The Trip to Italy (2014) and The Trip to Spain (2017). The film stars Steve Coogan and Rob Brydon as fictionalized versions of themselves continuing their culinary travels away from home.

Cast 
 Steve Coogan as Steve Coogan
 Rob Brydon as Rob Brydon
 Claire Keelan as Emma
 Rebecca Johnson as Sally
 Marta Barrio as Yolanda
 Tim Leach as Joe
 Cordelia Bugeja as Katherine
 Justin Edwards as Greg

Reception 
On review aggregator Rotten Tomatoes, the film has an approval rating of  based on  reviews. The site's critical consensus reads, "The Trip to Greece sees this series subject to the laws of diminishing returns, but Rob Brydon and Steve Coogan remain reliably enjoying company." On Metacritic, the film has a weighted average score of 69 out of 100, based on 31 critics, indicating "generally favorable reviews.

References

External links 
 
 

2020 films
2020s comedy road movies
Films about actors
Films about comedians
Films set in Greece
Films shot in Greece
Films directed by Michael Winterbottom
British buddy films
British road comedy-drama films
Greek-language films
Films edited from television programs
2020s English-language films
2020s British films